The Cornwall-Lebanon School District is a public school district covering the Boroughs of Cornwall and Mount Gretna and North Cornwall Township, North Lebanon Township, South Lebanon Township, West Cornwall Township and West Lebanon Township in Lebanon County, Pennsylvania. It is part of the Lancaster-Lebanon Intermediate Unit (IU 13).  The district operates one High School, one Middle School and four Elementary Schools.

Schools

Elementary schools 

Cornwall Elementary, located in historic Cornwall, Pennsylvania, home of the Cornwall Iron Furnace.
Ebenezer Elementary, one of the oldest elementary schools in Pennsylvania, then moved to a bigger location, now the largest elementary school.
South Lebanon Elementary, located in South Lebanon Township, is the smallest elementary school. 
Union Canal Elementary, named after the historic Union Canal Tunnel, it is located on the east end of the school district.

Middle school 

Cedar Crest Middle School

Secondary school 

Cedar Crest High School Located at 115 East Evergreen Road, Lebanon, PA 17042

References

External links 
Cornwall-Lebanon School District Website

School districts in Lebanon County, Pennsylvania